What I Want may refer to:

 "What I Want" (Dead or Alive song), 1983
 "What I Want" (Daughtry song), 2007
 "What I Want", a song by Fireball produced by Bob Sinclar
 What I Want, an album by The Breakers
 "What I Want is What I've Got", a song by Westlife from Westlife